Villingili as a place name may refer to:
 Villingili (Addu Atoll), a resort island in the Maldives 
 Villingili (Alif Dhaal Atoll), an uninhabited island in the Maldives
 Villingili (Gaafu Alif Atoll), an inhabited island in the Maldives
 Villingili (Malé), an inhabited island in the Maldives
 Villingili (Seenu Atoll), a resort island in the Maldives
Villingili (India), a village in the Lakshadweep group of islands, India